Aurora Flight Sciences is an American aviation and aeronautics research subsidiary of Boeing which primarily specializes in the design and construction of special-purpose Unmanned aerial vehicles. Aurora has been established for 20+ years and their headquarters is at the Manassas Regional Airport in Manassas, Virginia.

History 
In 1989, the company was founded in Alexandria, Virginia, as a follow-on to the MIT Daedalus project.

In 1991, its first aircraft was the Perseus proof of concept (POC) built for NASA which first flew at NASA Dryden. It was followed by two Perseus As and one Perseus B which were all built for the NASA ERAST Program. A twin engine Theseus was also built.

In 1995, Aurora joined the Global Hawk team and continues to build composite fuselage components and tail assemblies of the RQ-4 for Northrop Grumman and the USAF.

In 2002, a demonstration aircraft was flown from an altitude of 100,000 feet to simulate the low density of the martian atmosphere. Aurora has been involved in several NASA programs studying how to fly an aircraft on the planet Mars.

In 2008, the DARPA Vulture aimed for an UAV that could stay aloft for at least five years in the stratosphere, carrying a  payload: Aurora proposed three drones taking off separately then joining up in flight, to form an efficient flat wing at night, and folding into a Z for the best solar energy collection in daylight.

In 2009, as Aurora has developed its own line of small vertical take-off UAVs known as the Aurora Goldeneye, the third variant of this family, the GoldenEye-80, was first flown publicly at Association for Unmanned Vehicle Systems International's Unmanned Systems North America trade show.

On 5 October 2017, Boeing announced that it would be acquiring Aurora Flight Sciences.

In April 2018, as DARPA allowed Aurora to transition government-funded technology for commercial applications, the tilt-wing XV-24A Lightning Strike and its distributed propulsion could be reused for an electric commercial air taxi along its lift-and-cruise prototype with vertical flight rotors and cruise fixed propellers, unveiled in 2017. Aurora plans multiple demonstrators controlled centrally by 2020 and a piloted air taxi by 2023 with autonomy later depending on regulation.

In spring 2019, Aurora plans to fly a High-Altitude Long Endurance drone powered by solar cells and batteries, Odysseus.

Aurora won a DARPA CRANE (Control of Revolutionary Aircraft with Novel Effectors) grant to test a small-scale plane that uses compressed air bursts instead of external moving parts such as flaps. The program seeks to eliminate the weight, drag, and mechanical complexity involved in moving control surfaces. The air bursts modify the air pressure and flow, and change the boundaries between streams of air moving at different speeds. The company built a 25% scale prototype with 11 conventional control surfaces, as well as 14 banks fed by eight air channels.

Facilities 
Aurora has four facilities that each have their own focus. Corporate Headquarters and Engineering are in Manassas, Virginia. A manufacturing center was opened in Fairmont, West Virginia, in 1994, being moved to Bridgeport, West Virginia, in 2000. Another manufacturing facility was opened in Starkville, Mississippi, in 2005 before being moved to the nearby Golden Triangle Regional Airport in Columbus, Mississippi, in 2007. A research and development center was opened in Cambridge, Massachusetts in 2005 where Aurora now develops a line of micro air vehicles.

Aircraft 

 Perseus POC
 Perseus A
 Theseus
 Perseus B
 Chiron
 MarsFlyer
 GoldenEye 100
 GoldenEye 50
 GoldenEye 80
 Excalibur
 Centaur Optionally-Piloted Aircraft (OPA)
 Orion
 SunLight Eagle
 Odysseus
 Skate SUAS
 Tactical Autonomous Aerial Logistics System (TALOS)
 H-6U Unmanned Little Bird 
 Bell 206
 UH-1H UAV

Proposed  
 Aurora D8 for NASA by the Massachusetts Institute of Technology - currently under development. A flight test will be conducted by 2021.
 Virgin Galactic generation 2 mothership, for the next-generation Delta-class spaceplane, expected for 2025.

Cancelled 
 United States Air Force Advanced Composite Cargo Aircraft (ACCA) - lost out to Lockheed Martin X-55.
 The Aurora XV-24 LightningStrike was the selected proposal for the VTOL X-Plane program, cancelled in April 2018.

Other products 
 Robotic Copilot

References

External links 

 Aurora home page

Unmanned aerial vehicle manufacturers of the United States
Technology companies established in 1989
Manufacturing companies established in 1989
1989 establishments in Virginia
Manassas, Virginia
Manufacturing companies based in Virginia
Boeing mergers and acquisitions
2017 mergers and acquisitions